"Love Like This" is a song by Dublin-based alternative rock quartet Kodaline. The song was released as a digital download on 31 May 2013, as the second single from their debut studio album In a Perfect World (2013). The song peaked at number 8 on the Irish Singles Chart and number 22 on the UK Singles Chart.

Track listing

Chart performance

Weekly charts

Certifications

Release history

References

2013 singles
Kodaline songs
2013 songs